Strelchenko is a surname. Notable people with the surname include:

 Alexandra Strelchenko (1937–2019), Ukrainian actress and singer
 Natalia Strelchenko (1976–2015), Norwegian pianist
 Vladimir Strelchenko (born 1964), Russian politician

See also
 

Ukrainian-language surnames